Digital Union S.A. is a DVB-T Provider in Greece for the Regional Television stations.
Its shareholders are many Regional Television stations from all over Greece. The company's Headquarters is located in Metamorphosis district of Athens.

External links
 

Television in Greece